Whitton is a village and a community in Radnorshire, Powys, Wales. Hamlets in the community include Rhos-y-meirch and Pilleth.

The community's population in 2011 was 348.

St Mary's church is a grade II* listed building.

The community is part of the Llangunllo electoral ward for elections to Powys County Council.

References

Villages in Powys